Reconstruction is an album by Max Romeo, released in 1977.

Shortly after recording critically acclaimed War Ina Babylon, Max Romeo broke up with his producer Lee "Scratch" Perry on professional ground, what prompted him to self-produce his next album. Reconstruction did not match the success of its predecessor and in 1978 Romeo left Jamaica.

Track listing
Side A
"Reconstruction" (Max Romeo) – 4:16
"Poor Man's Life" (Max Romeo, Ricky Storm) – 3:49
"Let's Live Together" (Max Romeo, Michael Williams) – 3:40
"Melt Away" (Max Romeo, Earl Smith) – 3:53
"War Rock" (Max Romeo, Michael Williams) – 4:40
Side B
"Where Is the Love" (Max Romeo) – 3:00
"Give to Get" (Max Romeo) – 3:22
"Martin Luther King" (Max Romeo) – 3:26
"Take a Hold" (Max Romeo, Ricky Storm) – 3:27
"Destination Africa" (Max Romeo, Michael Ebanks) – 3:13

Personnel
Max Romeo - vocals, arrangements
Ernie Ranglin - guitar
Earl Smith - rhythm guitar
Earl Lindo - organ
Keith Sterling - piano
Boris Gardiner - bass
Michael "Mikey Boo" Richards - drums
Uziah "Sticky" Thompson - percussion
Glen DaCosta - saxophone
David Madden - trumpet
Vin Gordon - trombone
Bobby Ellis - flugelhorn
Jimmy Riley, Ricky Storm, Sheena - background vocals
Sylvan Morris - engineer

References

1977 albums
Island Records albums
Max Romeo albums